Tutts Clump is a small hamlet in the civil parish of Bradfield in the English county of Berkshire. Legend has it that the name is derived from that of an English Civil War general. There is a Methodist chapel in the hamlet. The local post office closed in 1983.

Hamlets in Berkshire
Bradfield, Berkshire